Alice Green is an African-American activist and prison reform advocate, living in Albany, New York.  An active participant in her community, Dr. Green was the Green Party candidate for Lt. Governor in 1998 and its Albany mayoral candidate in 2005.  Green is the Executive Director of The Center for Law and Justice, a non-profit civil rights organization that she founded in 1985. Her activism against racism and on issues of criminal justice has made her notable as well.

Early life, education and early career

Green was born in a small town in the Adirondacks area of Upstate New York, in the mid-1940s.

Green earned several degrees from SUNY Albany (now U. at Albany).   These include a bachelor's in African-American studies, master's degrees in education, social welfare and criminal justice, and a doctorate in criminal justice.

She worked as a secondary school teacher, a social worker, and as the Executive Director of the Trinity Institution (as of March 2009, the Trinity Alliance for the Capital Region).  Starting in the 1960s, Green's activism gained much local publicity, especially in her role as chair of the NAACP Legal Redress Committee.

She was Legislative Director for the New York Civil Liberties Union in the 1980s. In 1984, Green founded the Center For Law and Justice, Inc., after the police shooting of Jessie Davis, an African-American youth in Albany.

In 1985, Governor Mario Cuomo appointed her as a member of the Citizens Policy and Complaint Review Council of New York State Commission on Corrections. In 1986, Cuomo also appointed her as Deputy Commissioner for New York State Division of Probation and Correctional Alternatives.

Green organized "much-publicized protests at the annual Martin Luther King, Jr. Day events hosted by Governor Pataki from 1995 through 1999."

She briefly attended Albany Law School, in 1990, but did not complete her law degree.

Political campaigns
In 1998, Green ran for Lieutenant Governor on the Green Party of New York State ticket with Al "Grandpa" Lewis, and gained over 52,000 votes.

In 2005, she was a candidate for Mayor of Albany, which garnered significant local publicity.  She lost the race against incumbent Mayor Jerry Jennings, but garnered about 25% of the vote in November.

In 2008, Green served as a member of the "Committee to fill vacancies" for Green Presidential candidate Cynthia McKinney, but was later a contributor to Democrat Barack Obama.

Recent work

Green has been the Executive Director of The Center for Law and Justice, a not-for-profit community organization, for many years.  That group is part of the "Community Empowerment Center."  As part of her work, she is an EEO compliance officer.

She is an adjunct professor at the University at Albany, and writes and lectures frequently on racism and criminal justice issues. She is often sought out by members of the media for comment on such issues. In an interview for NEWS10, she said that if the SUNY Albany students (Alexis Briggs, Ariel Agudio and Asha Burwell - ABC STUDENTS), did attack first and were the ones being racist, they should be asked to apologise. And not be punished. NEWS10 Video

She is the co-author, with Frankie Y. Bailey, of a book, "Law Never Here: A Social History of African American Responses to Issues of Crime and Justice" (1999).  They also wrote "Wicked Albany: Lawlessness & Liquor in the Prohibition Era."

Legacy and personal life
Green has won numerous awards for her activism in the Capital District, including from the New York State Bar Association, NAACP, and Rockefeller College.

She has gained considerable notoriety over the years from her political stances, as well as racist and vicious criticism directed at her.

Her papers have been collected for the library at the University of Albany.

She is married to Charles L. Touhey, President of Touhey Associates, who also serves on the board of the Center For Law and Justice, Inc.

Electoral history

References

Living people
Year of birth missing (living people)
African-American people in New York (state) politics
African-American women in politics
African-American women writers
American women writers
African-American writers
Politicians from Albany, New York
University at Albany, SUNY alumni
New York (state) Greens
Activists from New York (state)
21st-century American women
21st-century African-American women
21st-century African-American politicians
21st-century American politicians